Yuxarı Ləki (also, Yukhary Lyaki) is a village in the Agdash Rayon of Azerbaijan.  The village forms part of the municipality of Orta Ləki.

References 

Populated places in Agdash District